North Wylam railway station served the village of Wylam, Northumberland, England from 1876 to 1968 on the Tyne Valley Line.

History 
The station opened on 13 May 1876 by the Scotswood, Newburn and Wylam Railway. The station was situated between Falcon Terrace and Main Road, north of the road bridge over the River Tyne. It is a 5-minute walk from Wylam station. The goods facilities were south of the station building which closed on 1 January 1961. Despite heavy passenger traffic, the station closed on 11 March 1968.

References

External links 

Disused railway stations in Northumberland
Railway stations in Great Britain opened in 1876
Railway stations in Great Britain closed in 1968
1876 establishments in England
1968 disestablishments in England
Beeching closures in England
Wylam